This is a list of the schools operated by the Wake County Public School System in Wake County, North Carolina.  It does not include the private schools or charter schools, nor the many home school/web-based school programs; which comprise over 10% of the student census.

School directory

High schools (9-12) (22 current schools)

Raleigh
Athens Drive High School
Needham B. Broughton High School
William G. Enloe High School
Leesville Road High School
Millbrook High School
Jesse O. Sanderson High School
Southeast Raleigh High School
Vernon Malone College and Career Academy
Wakefield High School

Apex
Apex High School
Apex Friendship High School

Cary
Cary High School
Green Hope High School
 Green Level High School (2019)
Middle Creek High School
Panther Creek High School

Fuquay-Varina
Fuquay-Varina High School
Willow Spring High School (2021)

Garner
Garner Magnet High School
South Garner High School (2018)

Holly Springs
Holly Springs High School

Knightdale
Knightdale High School

Rolesville
Rolesville High School

Wake Forest
Heritage High School
Wake Forest High School
North Wake College and Career Academy

Wendell
East Wake High School

Middle schools (6-8) (33 current schools)

Raleigh
 Fred J. Carnage Middle School
 Charles F. Carroll Magnet Middle School
 Centennial Campus Magnet Middle School
 Dillard Drive Middle School
 Durant Road Middle School
 East Millbrook Middle School
 Leesville Road Middle School
 John W. Ligon Middle School
 Leroy Martin Middle School
 Moore Square Middle School
 Oberlin Magnet Middle School
 Pine Hollow Middle School
 River Bend Middle School
 Wakefield Middle School
 West Millbrook Middle School

Apex
Apex Middle School
Apex Friendship Middle School (2018)
Lufkin Road Middle School
Salem Middle School

Cary
Alston Ridge Middle School (2019)
Davis Drive Middle School
East Cary Middle School
Mills Park Middle School
Reedy Creek Middle School
West Cary Middle School
West Lake Middle School

Fuquay-Varina
Fuquay-Varina Middle School

Garner
East Garner Middle School
North Garner Middle School

Holly Springs
Holly Grove Middle School
Holly Ridge Middle School

Knightdale
Neuse River Middle School

Rolesville
Rolesville Middle School

Wake Forest
Heritage Middle School
Wake Forest Middle School

Wendell
Wendell Middle School

Zebulon
Zebulon Middle School

Elementary schools (K-5) (104 schools)

Raleigh
Abbotts Creek Elementary School
Baileywick Elementary School
Barton Pond Elementary School (2021)
Barwell Road Elementary School
Banks Road Elementary school
Beaverdam Elementary School 
Brassfield Elementary School
Brentwood Elementary School
Brier Creek Elementary School
Brooks Elementary School
Bugg Elementary School
Combs Elementary School
Conn Elementary School
Dillard Drive Elementary School
Douglas Elementary School
Durant Road Elementary School
Forest Pines Elementary
Fox Road Elementary School
Fuller Elementary School
Green Elementary School
Harris Creek Elementary School
Hilburn Academy
Hunter Elementary School
Jeffreys Grove Elementary School
Jones Dairy Elementary School
Joyner Elementary School
Lacy Elementary School
Lake Myra Elementary school
Lead Mine Elementary School
Leesville Road Elementary School
Lynn Road Elementary School
Millbrook Elementary School
North Forest Pines Elementary
North Ridge Elementary School
Olds Elementary School
Partnership Elementary School
Pleasant Union Elementary School
Poe Elementary School
Powell Elementary School
River Bend Elementary School
Rogers Lane Elementary School
Root Elementary School
Smith Elementary School
Stough Elementary School
Swift Creek Elementary School
Sycamore Creek Elementary School
Underwood Elementary School
Vance Elementary School
Wakefield Elementary School
Washington Elementary School
Wilburn Elementary School
Wildwood Forest Elementary School
Wiley Elementary School
Yates Mill Elementary School
York Elementary School

Apex
Apex Elementary School
Apex Friendship Elementary School
Baucom Elementary School
Middle Creek Elementary School
Olive Chapel Elementary School
Salem Elementary School
Scotts Ridge Elementary School 
West Lake Elementary School
White Oak Elementary School

Cary
Adams Elementary School
Alston Ridge Elementary School
Briarcliff Elementary School
Carpenter Elementary School
Cary Elementary School
Davis Drive Elementary School
Farmington Woods Elementary School
Green Hope Elementary School
Highcroft Drive Elementary School 
Hortons Creek Elementary School 
Kingswood Elementary School
Laurel Park Elementary School
Mills Park Elementary School
Northwoods Elementary School
Penny Road Elementary School
Reedy Creek Elementary School
Turner Creek Elementary School
Weatherstone Elementary School

Fuquay-Varina
Ballentine Elementary School
Fuquay-Varina Elementary School
Herbert Akins Road Elementary School
Lincoln Heights Elementary School
South Lakes Elementary School

Garner
Aversboro Elementary School
Bryan Road Elementary School
Creech Road Elementary School
East Garner Elementary School
Rand Road Elementary School
Vance Elementary School
Timber Drive Elementary 
Vandora Springs Elementary School

Holly Springs
Buckhorn Creek Elementary School (2018)
Holly Grove Elementary School
Holly Ridge Elementary School
Holly Springs Elementary School
Oakview Elementary School

Knightdale
Forestville Road Elementary School
Hodge Road Elementary School
Knightdale Elementary School
Lockhart Elementary School

Morrisville
Cedar Fork Elementary School
Morrisville Elementary School
Parkside Elementary School (2019)
Pleasant Grove Elementary School

Rolesville
Rolesville Elementary School
Sanford Creek Elementary School

Wake Forest
Heritage Elementary School
Jones Dairy Elementary School
Wake Forest Elementary School

Willow Spring
Willow Springs Elementary School

Zebulon
Wakelon Elementary School
Zebulon Elementary School

Special/optional schools

Raleigh
Bridges Program (K-5)
Hilburn Drive Academy (K-8)
Longview School (6-12)
Mary E. Phillips High School (9-12)
Mt. Vernon School (6-8)
Project Enlightenment (Pre-K)
River Oaks Middle School (6-8)
Wake Early College of Health and Sciences (9-13)
Wake Early College of Information and Biotechnologies (9-13)
Vernon Malone College and Career Academy (9-13)
Wake Young Men's Leadership Academy (6-13)
Wake Young Women's Leadership Academy (6-13)

Cary
Wake STEM Early College High School (9-13)

References

External links

Year Round Schools Conversion
wral.com, WRAL-TV archive of year-round conversion stories
News & Observer's Wake school reassignment archive
Mandatory year-round assignment story archive from WRAL

 
School districts in North Carolina
Education in Raleigh, North Carolina
Education in Wake County, North Carolina
School districts established in 1976
1976 establishments in North Carolina